Miguel Angel García Sifontes (born April 3, 1967 in Caracas, Venezuela) is a former Major League Baseball left-handed relief pitcher who played for the California Angels (1987) and Pittsburgh Pirates (1987–1989).

In two seasons, García compiled a 0–2 record with 11 strikeouts and an 8.41 earned run average in 20⅓ innings pitched.

Personal life
Garcia and his wife Adrianna have two grown daughters, Mariangelica and Anacorina.

See also
 List of players from Venezuela in Major League Baseball

References

External links

Baseball Reference (Minors)
Baseball Gauge
Retrosheet
Venezuelan Professional Baseball League

1967 births
Living people
Buffalo Bisons (minor league) players
California Angels players
Caribes de Anzoátegui players
Harrisburg Senators players
Leones del Caracas players
Major League Baseball pitchers
Major League Baseball players from Venezuela
Midland Angels players
Ottawa Lynx players
Palm Springs Angels players
Pittsburgh Pirates players
Quad Cities Angels players
Baseball players from Caracas
Tigres de Aragua players
Venezuelan expatriate baseball players in Canada
Venezuelan expatriate baseball players in the United States
Venezuelan expatriate baseball players in Italy